Ketobutyric acid, ketobutanoic acid, oxobutyric acid, or oxobutanoic acid may refer to the following chemical compounds:

 α-Ketobutyric acid (2-oxobutyric acid)
 β-Ketobutyric acid (acetoacetic acid or 3-oxobutyric acid)